Scientific Research Institute Of Parachute Construction is a company based in Moscow, Russia. It is part of Technodinamika (Rostec group).

The Scientific Research Institute of Parachute Construction (NIIPS) is the primary organization for the research, design, development, and prototype production of all parachutes and parachute technology in Russia.

NIIPS has played a major role in parachute design and development for the Russian Space Program, including recovery parachutes for Soyuz, Buran, and Energia booster rockets and the Progress return capsule.

NIIPS also develops a variety of other products, including parachutes for both military and civilian applications, and equipment for the airline manufacturing and support industry.

References

External links

 Official website 

Parachuting organizations
Military parachutes
Manufacturing companies of Russia
Companies based in Moscow
Technodinamika
Research institutes in the Soviet Union
Aerospace companies of the Soviet Union
Ministry of the Aviation Industry (Soviet Union)
Research institutes established in 1946
1946 establishments in the Soviet Union